Scythris fuscicomella is a species of flower moth in the family Scythrididae.

The MONA or Hodges number for Scythris fuscicomella is 1659.

References

Further reading

External links

 

Scythrididae
Moths described in 1860